Marie-Philippe Coupin de la Couperie (1773, Sèvres - 1851, Versailles) was a French painter of the Troubadour style. He was a friend of the painter Anne-Louis Girodet de Roussy-Trioson.

Among his patrons were Joséphine de Beauharnais, who bought his The Tragic Love of Francesca da Rimini for her gallery at Château de Malmaison.  He became professor of drawing at two French military schools:  the Prytanée National Militaire and then the Ecole Spéciale Militaire de Saint-Cyr.

Gallery

External links
 
de la Couperie on Artnet
de la Couperie's lithograph Andromeda at the Art Institute of Chicago

1773 births
1851 deaths
18th-century French painters
French male painters
19th-century French painters
People from Sèvres
19th-century French male artists
18th-century French male artists